Atypical fibroxanthoma of the skin is a low-grade malignancy related to malignant fibrous histiocytoma, which it resembles histologically.

Diagnosis

Differential diagnoses
Squamous cell carcinoma
Malignant fibrous histiocytoma

Treatment
Surgical excision with clear margins.

Epidemiology
It occurs most commonly on the skin of sun-exposed, elderly patients. The majority of tumours are on the scalp, face, ears and upper limbs, but less commonly the tumour occurs on the limbs and trunk when there is a lack of association with sun exposure in younger individuals. The condition has also been noted in organ transplant recipients who may be in a state of immunosuppression. It has been reported that there is a predominance in men (70% men versus 30% women).

See also
Skin lesion
Skin cancer

References

External links 

 

Dermal and subcutaneous growths